The first series of the Irish talent competition series Ireland's Got Talent began broadcasting in Ireland during 2018, from 3 February to 24 March 2018 on TV3 and was hosted by Lucy Kennedy.

The judges for the first series were Denise van Outen, Jason Byrne, Michelle Visage and Louis Walsh.

The inaugural series was won by the dance troupe RDC.

According to the Irish Times, the debut episode attracted 521,800 viewers.

Series overview
The judges auditions were taped in November 2017 at the TLT Concert Hall & Theatre, Drogheda. The live shows were held at The Helix, Dublin which started on 19 March 2018, continuing at 21 March until the 24th for the final.

Semi-finals summary

Semi-final 1 (19 March)

Guest performer: Tokio Myers

Semi-final 2 (21 March)

Semi-final 3 (22 March)

Final (24 March)

References

External links
 Official website
 Ireland's Got Talent on Facebook

Got Talent
2018 Irish television seasons